David Peltier (born 26 September 1963) is a retired Barbadian sprinter who specialized in the 400 metres.

At the 1984 Olympic Games he finished seventh in the 4 x 400 metres relay, together with teammates Richard Louis, Clyde Edwards and Elvis Forde. Their time of 3:01.60 minutes is still the Barbadian record. Peltier also competed in the individual distance at the 1984 Olympics.

References

External links

1963 births
Living people
Barbadian male sprinters
Athletes (track and field) at the 1984 Summer Olympics
Olympic athletes of Barbados